The Sultan Abu Bakar Museum is a museum in Pekan, Pahang, Malaysia. It showcases the native people relics found in the country.

History
The museum building was constructed in the 1920s during British Malaya. Since then, the building has been used for the official residence for British government, army barracks and official palace of Sultan Abu Bakar. The building was then converted to a museum after four years of renovation. It was finally opened by Sultan Ahmad Shah on 21 October 1976.

Exhibitions
The museum exhibits collection of ancient Chinese glassware and ceramics, as well as artifacts related to the history of Pahang and Pahang Sultanate.

See also
 List of museums in Malaysia

References

External links
 

1976 establishments in Malaysia
Museums established in 1976
Buildings and structures in Pahang
History museums in Malaysia
Pekan District